Bailey's Billion$ is a 2005 children's feature film produced and directed by David Devine and starring Dean Cain, Laurie Holden, Jennifer Tilly, Tim Curry, and Jon Lovitz.

Plot

A talking Golden retriever named Bailey inherits a fortune from his deceased owner, Constance Pennington.  He becomes the target of a dog-napping plot by Constance's nephew Caspar and his wife Dolores.  The scheme is ultimately foiled.

Cast

References

External links

2005 films
2000s children's comedy films
Canadian children's comedy films
English-language Canadian films
Films set in Toronto
Films shot in Toronto
2005 comedy films
2000s English-language films
2000s Canadian films